Moth Boys is the second studio album by English indie rock band Spector, released on 21 August 2015.
The album reached number 27 in the UK Albums Chart on the week of its release.

Production
The album was recorded in New York and London in 2013 and 2014. It was produced by Duncan Mills, Dev Hynes and Adam Jaffrey.

Track listing

Chart performance

Personnel
 Fred Macpherson – vocals
 Tom Shickle – bass guitar
 Jed Cullen – guitar
 Danny Blandy – keyboard, synthesizer
 Yoann Intonti - drums

References 

2015 albums
Spector (band) albums
Fiction Records albums